Sunderland Bridge may refer to:

 Sunderland Bridge, County Durham, a bridge in county Durham, England
 Sunderland Bridge (village), village near the bridge
 Sunderland Bridge (Massachusetts), a bridge across the  Connecticut River in western Massachusetts, United States

See also 
 Wearmouth Bridge, the principal road bridge across the River Wear in the city of Sunderland, England, United Kingdom
 Wearmouth Bridge (1796), original bridge across the Wear, built 1796